Eagle is a village in the North Kesteven district of Lincolnshire, England. Eagle is part of the civil parish of Eagle and Swinethorpe. The population of the civil parish taken at the 2011 census was 793.

All Saints Anglican church dates from the 13th century and is Grade II listed. It was rebuilt in the 18th century and again in 1904.

The village has a primary school, post office, village hall, park, nursing home, playing field, and public house.

Toponymy
Scholars believe that the name means "Oak-tree wood or clearing.", from Old English āc, an oak-tree and Old English lēah, a forest, wood, glade or clearing, and in consequence, there is no connection to the large bird of prey, the eagle.

History
Eagle appears in Domesday Book: the landowners were: Roger of Poitou (property formerly by Arnketill Barn), Durand Malet, Odo the Crossbowman (land formerly owned by Gunnketill), and Countess Judith (land formerly owned by Earl Waltheof of Northumbria). Eagle had a church and a priest. Countess Judith's manor had a value of £12. Countess Judith was a niece of King William I of England – she was the daughter of his half-sister Adelaide of Normandy and her husband Lambert II, Count of Lens. She was also the widow of Earl Waltheof of Northumbria (1072–75, the last of the Anglo-Saxon Earls of England) who she had betrayed over his part in the Revolt of the Earls, and who was executed in 1076.

A preceptory of the Knights Templar was founded in Eagle by King Stephen. In 1312 it passed to the Hospitallers and became one of only two infirmaries for Templars in England. Stephen's original endowment included the manor of Eagle and the churches of Eagle, Swinderby and Scarle.

Lincolnshire preceptories
Until their disbandment in 1312, the Knights Templar were major landowners on the higher lands of Lincolnshire, where they had a number of preceptories on property which provided income, while Temple Bruer was an estate on the Lincoln Heath, believed to have been used also for military training. The preceptories from which the Lincolnshire properties were managed were:
Aslackby Preceptory, Kesteven
Bottesford, Lindsey
Eagle, Kesteven
Great Limber, Lindsey
Horkstow, Lindsey
Witham Preceptory, Kesteven
Temple Bruer, Kesteven
Willoughton Preceptory, Lindsey
Byard's Leap was part of the Temple Bruer estate.

Geography
The village main road is High Street, running approximately north-east to south-west. To the north of High Street the road to Scarle branches off towards the west; in the centre of the village Thorpe Road branches off towards the south-east. Church Lane on the west side of the village is a horseshoe loop joining High Street at both ends. Older maps show Green Lane, now a footpath, approximately parallel to High Street on its east.

There are three small housing estates: Falcon Close off Thorpe Lane, built in the 1960s; Hilltop Close off Scarle Lane, built in the 1970s; and Kestrel Rise off the southern High Street, built in the 1980s.

The areas and hamlets adjacent to the village are Eagle Moor, north-east; Eagle Hall, south-west; and Eagle Barnsdale, south-east. The nearest villages are Swinderby, south; North Scarle, west; and Thorpe on the Hill, east.

Eagle is excellently situated for access to the A1 going north and south via the A57 and A46 respectively. It is also only 15 minutes from Newark Northgate station with East Coast Line connections to Edinburgh, Leeds and London (90 mins travel time). Consequently, villages on the SW side of Lincoln are attracting commuters able to afford properties that would be out of reach in the SE. Eagle is home to a number of businesses including catering, software, secondhand/antiquarian books, game shooting, solar panels and horse management.

See also
Eagle Barnsdale

References

External links

Villages in Lincolnshire
North Kesteven District